Utsarga (Bengali: উৎসর্গ; English: Dedication) is a Bengali language poetry book  by Rabindranath Tagore. It was published in 1914. It is a notable creation in the "Intermediate Period" of Tagore's poetry. He had included 1 poem of "Utsarga" in the Nobel Prize winning work Song Offerings.

References

External links 

 Utsarga – Wikisource (Bengali)
 rabindra-rachanabali.nltr.org (Bengali)

1914 poetry books
Bengali poetry collections
Poetry collections by Rabindranath Tagore